Russell Tapp (born 15 April 1943) is a British luger. He competed in the men's doubles event at the 1976 Winter Olympics.

References

1943 births
Living people
British male lugers
Olympic lugers of Great Britain
Lugers at the 1976 Winter Olympics
Place of birth missing (living people)